Quizzical Pictures, formerly known as Curious Pictures until 2012, is a South African film and television production company based in the Johannesburg area.

The company was originally founded as Weekly Mail Television in 1993 and then Mail & Guardian Television. The company separated from the Mail & Guardian in 1999, becoming Curious Pictures. As to avoid confusion with the American production company of the same name, the company's name changed again in 2012 to Quizzical Pictures. In 2014, the studio moved to a warehouse facility in Randburg.

Dramas, comedies, and reality joints produced by Quizzical have garnered a number of awards and nominations, including at the SAFTAs, Africa Movie Academy Awards, the Rose d'Or, Peabody Award, and International Emmy Awards.

Productions

Film

Television

References

Companies based in Johannesburg
Entertainment companies established in 1993
Film production companies of South Africa
Mass media companies established in 1993
Mass media in Johannesburg
South African companies established in 1993
Television production companies of South Africa